Vidak (Cyrillic script: Видак) is a South Slavic masculine given name. Notable people with the name include:

Vidak Bratić, Serbian footballer
Andy Vidak, American politician
Marijeta Vidak, Croatian handball player

See also
Vidaković

Slavic masculine given names
Serbian masculine given names